Cooyar is a rural town and locality in the Toowoomba Region, Queensland, Australia.

Geography

History
Land in Cooyar was open for selection on 17 April 1877;  were available.

Cooyar Post Office opened by March 1907 (a receiving office had been open from 1904).

St Francis' Anglican Church was dedicated on 12 April 1928. Its closure on 28 March 1999 was approved by Assistant Bishop Ray Smith.

Attractions
There are many interesting sites at Cooyar.  They include the Swinging Bridge, built by Christoffel and Edeltroud Van Espen  a memorial park with playground,  a family-friendly pub, an ANZAC Memorial, a showground which holds events like endurance riding and an annual show (with a brilliant rodeo at night),  a hall which is used regularly by the locals, the local shop which sells hot and cold food.

Library services in Cooyar are provided by the Toowoomba Regional Council's mobile library service. The van visits Cooyar State School and Cooyar Park (McDougal Street) on the 1st and 3rd Tuesday of each month.

Heritage listings

Cooyar has a number of heritage-listed sites, including:
 McDougall Street: Cooyar War Memorial
 Narko-Nutgrove Road from Highgrove to Nutgrove, south-west of Cooyar: Muntapa Tunnel

References 

Towns in Queensland
Towns in the Darling Downs
Toowoomba Region
Localities in Queensland